Marco Komenda (born 26 November 1996) is a German professional footballer who plays as a defender for Holstein Kiel.

References

External links
 
 
 

1996 births
Living people
Sportspeople from Darmstadt
Footballers from Hesse
Association football defenders
German footballers
Croatian footballers
German people of Croatian descent
Sportfreunde Siegen players
Borussia Mönchengladbach II players
SV Meppen players
Holstein Kiel players
2. Bundesliga players
3. Liga players
Regionalliga players